In enzymology, a taurine dioxygenase is an enzyme that catalyzes the chemical reaction.

taurine + 2-oxoglutarate + O2  sulfite + aminoacetaldehyde + succinate + CO2

The 3 substrates of this enzyme are taurine, 2-oxoglutarate, and O2, whereas its 4 products are sulfite, aminoacetaldehyde, succinate, and CO2.

This enzyme belongs to the family of oxidoreductases, specifically those acting on paired donors, with O2 as oxidant and incorporation or reduction of oxygen. The oxygen incorporated need not be derived from O2 with 2-oxoglutarate as one donor, and incorporation of one atom o oxygen into each donor.  The systematic name of this enzyme class is taurine, 2-oxoglutarate:O2 oxidoreductase (sulfite-forming). Other names in common use include 2-aminoethanesulfonate dioxygenase, and alpha-ketoglutarate-dependent taurine dioxygenase.  This enzyme participates in taurine and hypotaurine metabolism.  It has 3 cofactors: iron, Ascorbate,  and Fe2+.

Structural studies

Mechanism

Initiating steps 
In the decomposition of taurine, it has been shown that molecular oxygen is activated by Iron II, which lies in the coordinating complex of taurine dioxygenase.  Here the enzyme with conjunction of an Iron II and 2-oxoglutarate maintain non-covalent bonds by electrostatic interactions, and coordinate a nucleophilic attack from dioxygen on 2-oxoglutarate carbon number 2.  This leads to the two oxidations, one on 2-oxoglutarate, and another on taurine, each one electron.

References

Further reading 

 

EC 1.14.11
Iron enzymes
Ascorbate enzymes
Enzymes of known structure